Dragalina is a commune in Călărași County, Muntenia, Romania, named after the Romanian general Ion Dragalina. It is composed of three villages: Constantin Brâncoveanu, Dragalina and Drajna Nouă.

As of 2007 the population of Dragalina is 8,575.

References

Communes in Călărași County
Localities in Muntenia